The 1929 Providence Steam Roller season was their fifth in the league. The team failed to improve on their previous season's output of 8–1–2, winning only four games. They finished eighth in the league. The Steam Roller played in the first night game in league history against the Cardinals, losing 16–0.

Schedule

Standings

References

Providence Steam Roller seasons
Providence Steam Roller